The 1999 Michigan State Spartans football team represented Michigan State University in the 1999 NCAA Division I-A football season.  The Spartans played their home games at Spartan Stadium in East Lansing, Michigan. This was the last year for head coach Nick Saban, who left the program on December 5 to take the head coaching position at LSU. During the bowl game, the Spartans were coached by interim head coach Bobby Williams, who led the Spartans to a 37–34 victory in the 2000 Florida Citrus Bowl over the Florida Gators of the Southeastern Conference, with a last second, game-winning field goal by kicker Paul Edinger.

This Spartan team featured the likes of Plaxico Burress, T. J. Duckett, and Renaldo Hill, and goes down as one of the best Spartan teams in the BCS era.

Schedule

Rankings

Game summaries

Michigan

Bill Burke threw for a school-record 400 yards and two touchdowns while Plaxico Burress set a new mark with 255 yards receiving. Burke broke Ed Smith's record of 369 against Indiana in 1979 while Burress surpassed Andre Rison's 252 yards against Georgia in 1989. Michigan State was now 6–0 for the first time since the 1966 national championship season.

Roster

2000 NFL Draft
The following players were selected in the 2000 NFL Draft.

References

Michigan State
Michigan State Spartans football seasons
Citrus Bowl champion seasons
Michigan State Spartans football